Tristichopterus, with a maximum length of 60cm, is the smallest genus in the family of prehistoric lobe finned fish, Tristichopteridae that was believed to have originated in the north and dispersed throughout the course of the Upper Devonian into Gondwana. Tristichopterus currently has only one named species first described by Egerton in 1861. The Tristichopterus node is thought to have originated during the Givetian part of the Devonian. Tristichopterus was thought by Egerton to be unique for its time period as a fish with ossified vertebral centers, breaking the persistent notochord rule of most Devonian fish but this was later reinspected and shown to be only partial ossification by Dr. R. H. Traquair.  Tristichopterus alatus closely resembles Eusthenopteron and this sparked some debate after its discovery as to whether it was a separate taxon.

Geological 
It is believed that Tristichopterus originated in the Laurussian continent along with the similar Eusthenopteron, and that later derived members, like Eusthenodon, of the Tristichopteridae family achieved wider distribution into Gondwana.  The modern day geographical locations that Tristichopterus is thought to have lived are Australia, Western Europe, and Greenland.

Historical Information and Discovery 
The two first specimens of Tristichopterus were dug up in the Old Redstone of the John o’ Groats group in Caithness by a Mr. C. W. Peach and described by Sir Philip Egerton in 1861. A lot of confusion has surrounded this taxon as the first specimens lacked head, fin, and dentition osteology.  The original classification by Egerton was to put it in the same family as Dipterus with Coelacanthi.

In 1864 and 1865 Peach obtained further specimens of the genus with clear paired fin, head, and dentition osteology that prevented its placement within the Coelacanthi clade with Dipterus.  Ramsay Traquair in 1875 instead included Tristichopterus in the Cyclopteridae family.  Later Tristichopterus was assigned its own family.

Eusthenopteron foordi and Tristichopterus alatus are fairly similar in a number of regards but have a couple features between them that prevented the dissolution of either genus upon E. foordi’s discovery by Whiteaves in 1883.  Eusthenopteron can be distinguished from Tristichopterus by the possession of two fang pairs on the ectopterygoid and posterior coronoid, a very long posterior coronoid (twice as long as anterior and middle), and ethmosphenoid longer than the oticooccipital and a more symmetric caudal fin.  Eusthenopteron is also distinctly larger than Tristichopterus.  The original defining features that were used to initially separate the two were the greater symmetricity of E. foordi’s caudal fin and the presence of two cutting edges in the laniary teeth of E. foordi.

Description 
The general form of Tristichopterus is slender with fins biasing towards the posterior parts of its body.  The caudal fin is partially between the heterocercal condition of Dipterus and the diphycercal shape of Sirenidae.  The rays that compose the fins of Tristichopterus are fine and innumerable and overlapping as in Dipnoi.

The typical specimen is 10.5 inches in length, its head taking up a fifth of that measurement.  The greater depth of its body being just behind its subacutely lobate pectorals, measuring at 2 inches.  The first dorsal originates 6 inches back and the second and 1 and ¼ inches further back.  The sets of ventral and anal tails are placed opposite each other.  The start of the lower lobe of the caudal fin occurs 8 ¼ inches from the front, its upper lobe beginning a little further back.  The pectorals are attached 2 ¼ inches from the front.  Most common length of an adult Tristichopterus was thought to be 15 inches.

The head of Tristichopterus sports a cranial buckler for protection, similar to Saurodipterini, and is divided into an anterior, longer, and a posterior, wider, parts.  External naris on the original specimen were not observed and thought to be closer to the lip, like in Osteolepis and Diplopterus.  On the labial margin of the snout Tristichopterus has small conical teeth.  The aforementioned cranial shield on its posterior margin is composed of three parts: one mesial and polygonal in shape and two lateral, triangular in shape. These dermal bones are equivalent to transverse supral temporal chain elements in Polypeterus and Lepidosteus. A large oblong plate covers a significant portion of the cheek in front of the opercular bones contacting the hind part of the maxilla.  The plate articulates just in front of the orbit with a hyomandibular mechanism similar to Gyroptychius, possibly a pre operculum.  The orbit itself is placed very far forward on the skull. 

Tristichopterus has a lower jaw is as long as its cranium proper and its operculum, on its anterior margin, is inclined down and back.  The maxilla abuts below the cheek plate and suborbitals and is a long narrow bar that widens slightly at its posterior and at its anterior is capped with a small premaxilla.  Long, robust and slenderer than Saurodipterini the lower jaw from the side is seen as straight but from the front it curves inwards to the symphysis.  On its lower jaw, Tristichopterus has two stout sharp conical teeth 1/8 inch in length by 1/16 in diameter at base.  All teeth are slightly incurved, with fluting at bottom of larger teeth.  A pulp cavity was observed to reach the central cavity in most teeth.  Notably, Tristichopterus, like Eusthenopteron, lacks dentary fangs which are present in all other tristichopterids.

The shoulder girdle of Tristichopterus has no distinct attachment to the skull, but sports a stout broad oblong plate in place of a clavicle and shows evidence of a second supra-clavicular.  The pectoral fin is large and obovately shaped like a fan with its terminus rounded and consisting of the aforementioned slender rays. The fin is characterized by a central scaled lobe half its length and bifurcates soon after its origin, divided by transverse articulations as it repeats frequently.

Tristichopterus has its first dorsal opposite its ventrals, small and narrow, elliptic lanceolate in shape.  The second dorsal is larger and expanded triangular form, closely proportioned to the anal.  The caudal fin is again the previously written intermediate between a diphycercal and a heterocercal tail, also large and fan shaped and sports the stoutest fin rays in the entire structure. 

The scales of the body are thin and rounding.  They are of decent size and show a deeply imbricating, exposed surface, ornamented by striae that are closely set and raised.  The scales of lateral line may be perforated by a slime canal and notched posteriorly.

The vertebral column of Tristichopterus is made up of osseous members with distinct neural arches that pass upward into spines.  These spines flatten out laterally towards the front of the body.  Supporting the second dorsal and anal fins is a large flattened bony pieces that could possibly be a composite spinous apophysis, resulting from a three spine union. Neurapophyseal ossicles support the anterior rays of the upper lobe of the caudal fin.

References 
9. Traquair, R. (1875). 2. On the Structure and Systematic Position of Tristichopterus alatus, Egerton. Proceedings of the Royal Society of Edinburgh, 8, 513-513. doi:10.1017/S0370164600030285

10. Young, G.C. 2008. Relationships of tristichopterids (osteolepiform lobe-finned fishes) from the Middle– Late Devonian of East Gondwana. Alcheringa 32, 321–336. ISSN 0311-5518.

Prehistoric lobe-finned fish genera
Tristichopterids
Devonian bony fish
Devonian fish of Europe

Transitional fossils